Heat urticaria presents within five minutes after the skin has been exposed to heat above , with the exposed area becoming burned, stinging, and turning red, swollen, and indurated.

See also 
 Urticaria
 Skin lesion
 List of cutaneous conditions

References

External links 

Urticaria and angioedema